Noblesse Oblige (literally "The Realm of Unusual Officials") is a 2014 till 2015 Hong Kong period drama set during the later years of Kangxi Emperor's Qing dynasty rule. Produced by Lee Tim-sing, it stars Kenneth Ma, Tavia Yeung as the main leads, with Joel Chan, Benjamin Yuen, Ram Chiang and Cilla Kung as the major supporting cast. The drama was filmed from January till April 2014. First original broadcast began on Hong Kong's Jade and HD Jade channels December 29, 2014 till January 24, 2015 every Monday through Friday during its 8:30-9:30 pm timeslot with a total of 21 episodes, the last two episodes were aired on the same night as a two-hour finale.

This is Kenneth Ma and Tavia Yeung's fifth collaboration. The two previously starred together in The Mysteries of Love, The Hippocratic Crush l & ll and Three Kingdoms RPG.

This is also Joel Chan's first drama since previously quitting acting to concentrate on his personal life.

Synopsis
"Noblesse Oblige" is a French term meaning those who are privileged are obligated to help those that are less fortunate.

To Chun-fung (Kenneth Ma) is the illegitimate son of an affluent banking family during the Qing dynasty, but due to his birth title and his step-mothers he doesn't have much ambitions in life. Wanting to help the poor people in his county he decides to borrow money from his father and open a unique kind of bank. Instead of currency, his bank lends tools to people so that they can be employed. When nuns to-be Wai Lam (Tavia Yeung) and Wai Yu (Cilla Kung) borrows from Chun-fung's bank to renovate their monastery and is unable to pay him back they are forced to be his personal servants and body guards.

Prince Yu (Ram Chiang) takes notice of Chun-fung's clever idea and pushes him to be a government magistrate. Wanting to eradicate corrupted officials and with the help of Prince Yu, his older half-brother To Chun-ming (Joel Chan), who is the imperial governor of their province, and help of his best-friend Fong Gwai-cheung (Benjamin Yuen), Chun-fung becomes a magistrate. With Lam and Yu's protection against those who want to retaliate Chun-fung's cleansing of corruption he is able to take down many corrupted government officials but he is faced with having to choose doing right or family when one of the corrupted officials is Chun-ming.

Cast

Main cast
Kenneth Ma as To Chun-fung 杜振鋒
Tavia Yeung as Wai Lam 惠琳
Joel Chan as To Chun-ming 杜振銘
Benjamin Yuen as Fong Gwai-cheung 方貴祥
Ram Chiang as Prince Yu 裕親王
Cilla Kung as Wai Yu 惠瑜

To family
Lau Dan as To Chor-lam 杜楚南
Susan Tse as Tong Yun-ching  唐婉貞
Celine Ma as Ho Sau-yee 何秀儀
Lily Poon as Chiu Siu-yin   趙小燕
Janey Yan as Chui Suk-chau 崔素秋
Dolby Kwan as To Chun-kwan 杜振鈞
Leo Tsang as Ma Sing 馬誠
Jenny Wong as head maid Lau 劉大媽
Feifei Chu as Heung Miu 香梅
Ice Chow as Heung Lan 香蘭
Melody Ng as Law Siu-ying 羅小螢

Imperial Qing Dynasty court
Gary Chan as Kangxi Emperor 康熙帝
Li Shing-cheong as Wing Bak-hin  榮伯軒
Eric Li as Sek Si-suen 石之信
Eddie Law as Suk Tat 索達
Chan Wing-chun as Official Chu 朱公旦
Joseph Yeung as Gwan Gin-yan 關建仁
Ricky Lee as Yu Ding-fan 余定帆

Extended cast
Yoyo Chen as Bak Hau-ling 白巧靈
Yu Chi-ming as Koo Jun-on 顧仲安
Vincent Cheung as Wu Jo-gwong 胡祖光
Sunny Tai as On Tai-hoi 安大海
Sam Tsang as Man Sai-coeng 萬世昌
Rainbow Ching as Mrs. Ci-yan 慈恩師太
Akai Lee as Nap Lan Yi-tai 納蘭爾泰
Wendy Hon as Man Fung-ying 文鳳英
Wong Wai-tong as Kwok Yung 郭勇
Joe Junior as Fan Sai-si 范西斯
Shally Tsang as Wai Yuk 惠珏
Andy Sui as Ng Ching-hung 吳正鴻
Wang Wai-tak as Lam Jin-leung 林展良
Chan Min-leung as Tin Yi-nau 田二牛
Helen Ng as Mok San-leung 莫三娘
Eddie Li as Luk San 陸山
Mok Wai-man as Fung Hok-tak馮鶴德
Louis Szeto as Suen Ho-yin 孫浩然
Kedar Wong as Ching Hau-lai 程孝禮
Chan Dik-hak as real Miu Fat 妙法真人
Albert Law as Cho Koon-nam 曹冠南
Ngai Wai-man as Sung Chi-yuen 宋致遠
So Lai-ming as Sung Chi-yuen's wife 宋致遠之妻
Ho Chun-hin as Koo Ceok-tin 古卓天
Rocky Cheng as killer 殺手

Development
The title during early developments of the drama was "Top Quality Petty Official 極品芝麻品", because producer Lee Tim-sing thought the title sounded too simple it was changed to "The Beauty of Bureaucracy 官場浮世繪" during start of production. During post-production of the drama the title was once again changed to the confirmed title "Noblesse Oblige 宦海奇官'.
The costume fitting ceremony was held on January 23, 2014 12:45 p.m. at Tseung Kwan O TVB City Studio One.
The blessing ceremony was held on February 18, 2014 at Tseung Kwan O TVB City.
An early preview if Noblesse Oblige was shown at FILMART 2014 in April 2014.

Viewership Ratings

Awards and nominations

International Broadcast
  - 8TV (Malaysia)

References

External links
Official website 

TVB dramas
2014 Hong Kong television series debuts
2015 Hong Kong television series endings